Ayagoz (اياكٶز اۋدانى) is a district of Abai Region in eastern Kazakhstan. The administrative center of the district is the town of Ayagoz. Population:   

The district is served by Turkestan-Siberia Railway. Aktogay station, located within the district, is an important junction.

References

Districts of Kazakhstan
East Kazakhstan Region